In linguistics, functional sentence perspective (FSP) is a theory describing the information structure of the sentence and language communication in general. It has been developed in the tradition of the Prague School of Functional and Structural Linguistics together with its sister theory, Topic-Focus Articulation.

The key concepts of FSP were laid down by Jan Firbas in the mid-1950s on the basis of the linguistic work of Vilém Mathesius, especially his idea of functional syntax in linguistic characterology of language.

Terminology
The term 'functional sentence perspective' was created by Jan Firbas as a more convenient English equivalent of Mathesius’ Czech term aktuální členění větné:

Within Czech linguistics the Czech calque of the English term Functional Sentence Perspective funkční větná perspektiva is nowadays used to refer to the approach stemming from the writings of Jan Firbas and his followers, while the original Mathesius’ Czech term aktuální členění větné tends to be associated with the group of linguists developing the Topic-Focus Articulation, i.e. Petr Sgall, Eva Hajičová, Jarmila Panevová and their disciples, despite the fact that both terms are still sometimes used interchangeably in some Czech contributions to the topic of information structure of language. (Cf.  Karlík - Nekula - Pleskalová (2002))

Key terms
 communicative dynamism
 theme, theme proper, diatheme, hypertheme, thematic progressions
 transition, transition proper
 rheme, rheme proper, rhematizers
 communicative units, communicative fields

FSP factors
 sentence linearity
 Firbasian dynamic semantic scales, dynamic semantic functions
 context
 prosody

Key researchers
 František Daneš
 Libuše Dušková
 Jan Firbas
 Vilém Mathesius
 Aleš Svoboda

See also
 Topic-comment
 Prague school (linguistics)
 Functional theories of grammar

References
 Firbas, J. (1957) "On the problem of non-thematic subjects in contemporary English", Časopis pro moderní filologii 39, pp. 171–3. (English summary of "K otázce nezákladových podmětů v současné angličtině", ib. pp. 22–42 and 165-73)
 Firbas, J. (1994) "Round table on functional linguistics, 1 April 1993, University of Vienna: Prof. J. Firbas", VIenna English Working paperS, Vol.3, No.1, pp. 4–5
 Karlík P., Nekula M., Pleskalová J. (ed.) (2002) Encyklopedický slovník češtiny, Prague: Nakl. Lidové noviny.

Further reading

 Martin Drápela (2015) "The FSP bibliography" IN Martin Drápela (Ed.): A Bibliography of Functional Sentence Perspective 1956-2011, Brno: Masaryk University, pp 33-186.  
 Libuše Dušková (2015) "Czech approaches to information structure: theory and applications" IN Martin Drápela (Ed.): A Bibliography of Functional Sentence Perspective 1956-2011, Brno: Masaryk University, pp 9-32. 
 Jan Firbas (1992) Functional sentence perspective in written and spoken communication, Cambridge: Cambridge University Press
 Jan Firbas (1999) "Communicative dynamism" IN Jef Verschueren, Jan-Ola Östman, Jan Blommaert and Chris Bulcaen (Eds.): Handbook of Pragmatics - 1999 Installment,  Amsterdam: John Benjamins. 
 Vilém Mathesius (1939) "O tak zvaném aktuálním členění větném" [On the so-called functional sentence perspective], Slovo a slovesnost 5, pp. 171–4
 Vilém Mathesius (1975) A Functional analysis of present day English on a general linguistic basis, Prague: Academia
 Aleš Svoboda (1968) "The hierarchy of communicative units and fields as illustrated by English attributive constructions", Brno Studies in English 7, pp. 49–101. ISSN 1211-1791
 Aleš Svoboda (1981) Diatheme (A study in thematic elements, their contextual ties, thematic progressions and scene progressions based on a text from Ælfric), Brno: Filozofická fakulta Masarykovy univerzity
 Aleš Svoboda (1989) Kapitoly z funkční syntaxe [Chapters from functional syntax], Prague: Státní pedagogické nakladatelství
 Henri Weil (1887) De l'ordre des mots dans les langues anciennes comparées aux langues modernes: question de grammaire générale. 1844. Published in English as The order of words in the ancient languages compared with that of the modern languages.

Linguistics